The Medical Research Council (MRC) is responsible for co-coordinating and funding medical research in the United Kingdom. It is part of United Kingdom Research and Innovation (UKRI), which came into operation 1 April 2018, and brings together the UK's seven research councils, Innovate UK and Research England. UK Research and Innovation is answerable to, although politically independent from, the Department for Business, Energy and Industrial Strategy.

The MRC focuses on high-impact research and has provided the financial support and scientific expertise behind a number of medical breakthroughs, including the development of penicillin and the discovery of the structure of DNA. Research funded by the MRC has produced 32 Nobel Prize winners to date.

History
The MRC was founded as the Medical Research Committee and Advisory Council in 1913, with its prime role being the distribution of medical research funds under the terms of the National Insurance Act 1911. This was a consequence of the recommendation of the Royal Commission on Tuberculosis, which recommended the creation of a permanent medical research body. The mandate was not limited to tuberculosis, however.

In 1920, it became the Medical Research Council under Royal Charter. A supplementary Charter was formally approved by the Queen on 17 July 2003. In March 1933, MRC established the first scientific published medical patrol named British Journal of Clinical Research and Educational Advanced Medicine, as a periodical publication intended to further the progress of science, usually by reporting new research. It contain articles that have been peer reviewed, in an attempt to ensure that articles meet the journal's standards of quality, and scientific validity, allow researchers to keep up to date with the developments of their field and direct their own research.

In August 2012, the creation of the MRC-NIHR Phenome Centre, a research centre for personalised medicine, was announced. The MRC-NIHR National Phenome Centre is based at Imperial College London and is a combination of inherited equipment from the anti-doping facilities used to test samples during the 2012 Olympic and Paralympic Games. and additional items from the Centre's technology partners Bruker and Waters Corporation. The Centre, led by Imperial College London and King's College London, is funded with two five-year grants of £5 million from the Medical Research Council and the National Institute for Health and Care Research (NIHR) and was officially opened in June 2013.

Notable research
Important work carried out under MRC auspices has included:
 the identification of the dietary cause of rickets by Sir Edward Mellanby. Mellanby also carried out human experimentation regarding vitamin A and C deficiencies on volunteers at the Sorby Research Institute;
 the discovery, in 1918, that influenza is caused by a virus;
 the description of neurotransmission and the first neurotransmitter, acetylcholine, by Sir Henry Hallett Dale and Otto Loewi, leading to a Nobel Prize for Physiology or Medicine in 1936;
 the development of penicillin by Sir Alexander Fleming, Sir Ernst Boris Chain and Lord Florey, gaining them the 1945 Nobel Prize;
 linkage of lung cancer to tobacco smoking by Sir Richard Doll and Sir Austin Bradford Hill in the British doctors study, published in 1956;
 the discovery of the structure of DNA by James D. Watson, Francis Crick, Rosalind Franklin and Professor Maurice Wilkins. Three would receive the 1962 Nobel Prize for Physiology and Medicine for their discovery;
 the development of magnetic resonance imaging in 1973 by Professor Peter Mansfield and independently by Paul Lauterbur. This would lead to the 2003 Nobel Prize;
 the development of monoclonal antibodies at the MRC Laboratory of Molecular Biology by César Milstein and Georges Köhler in 1975 (1984 Nobel Prize);
 the development of DNA sequencing by Frederick Sanger of the MRC Laboratory of Molecular Biology in 1977 (1980 Nobel Prize);
 the identification, in 1983, of folic acid as a preventive measure for spina bifida and neural tube defects;
 the conducting of large studies in the 1970s and 1980s which established that aspirin can decrease the risk of cardiovascular disease;
 the publication of the genome of C. elegans, the first multicellular organism to receive this treatment, in 1998;
 the ongoing Heart Protection Study, showing benefits of primary prevention with simvastatin in patients at high risk for cardiovascular disease;
 Dr Venki Ramakrishnan of the MRC Laboratory of Molecular Biology winning the Nobel Prize for Chemistry in 2009 for showing how ribosomes, the tiny protein-making factories inside cells, function at the atomic level;
 the discovery that early treatment of HIV-infected babies with anti-retroviral therapy can dramatically increase their chances of survival;
 the development of a test for detecting infectious prions on surgical instruments which is more accurate than previous tests and 100 times faster;
 the identification of the second ever genetic variant associated with obesity; and
 the finding that high quality surgery combined with a short course of radiotherapy can halve the rate of recurrence of colorectal cancer.

Scientists associated with the MRC have received a total of 32 Nobel Prizes, all in either Physiology or Medicine or Chemistry

Organisation and leadership
The MRC is one of seven Research Councils which are part of UK Research and Innovation, in turn part of the Department for Business, Energy and Industrial Strategy. In the past, the MRC has been answerable to the Office of Science and Innovation, part of the Department of Trade and Industry.

The MRC is advised by a council which directs and oversees corporate policy and science strategy, ensures that the MRC is effectively managed, and makes policy and spending decisions. Council members are drawn from industry, academia, government and the NHS. Members are appointed by the Secretary of State for Business, Energy and Industrial Strategy. Daily management is in the hands of the Executive Chair. Members of the council also chair specialist boards on specific areas of research. For specific subjects, the council convenes committees.

Chairmen
 1913–1916: Lord Moulton
 1916–1920: Major Waldorf Astor
 1920–1924: Viscount Goschen
 1924: Edward F.L. Wood
 1924–1929: The Rt Hon. the Earl of Balfour
 1929–1934: The Rt Hon. Viscount D'Abernon
 1934–1936: the Marquess of Linlithgow
 1936–1948: Lord Balfour of Burleigh
 1948–1951: The Rt Hon. Viscount Addison
 1952–1960: The Earl of Limerick
 1960–1961: Viscount Amory
 1961–1965: Lord Shawcross
 1965–1969: Viscount Amory
 1969–1978: the Duke of Northumberland
 1978–1982: Lord Shepherd
 1982–1990: Earl Jellicoe
 1990–1998: Sir David Plastow
 1998–2006: Sir Anthony Cleaver
 2006–2012: Sir John Chisholm
 2012–2018: Sir Donald Brydon, CBE
 2018–present: Professor Fiona Watt
MRC CEOs are normally automatically knighted.

Chief Executives
As Chief Executives (originally secretaries) served:
 1914–33: Sir Walter Morley Fletcher
 1933–49: Sir Edward Mellanby
 1949–68: Sir Harold Himsworth
 1968–77: Sir John Gray
 1977–87: Sir James L. Gowans
 1987–96: Sir Dai Rees
 1996–2003: Professor Sir George Radda
 2003–2007: Professor Sir Colin Blakemore
 2007–2010: Professor Sir Leszek Borysiewicz
 2010–2018: Professor Sir John Savill

Institutes, centres and units
The MRC has units, centres and institutes in the UK and one unit in each of The Gambia and Uganda.

The following is a list of the MRC's current institutes, centres and units:

Bristol
 MRC Integrative Epidemiology Unit at the University of Bristol (MRC IEU)

Cambridge
 MRC Biostatistics Unit (BSU)
 MRC Cancer Unit
 MRC Cognition and Brain Sciences Unit (MRC CBSU)
 MRC Epidemiology Unit at the University of Cambridge (MRC EU)
 MRC Laboratory of Molecular Biology (LMB)
 MRC Metabolic Diseases Unit (MRC MDU)
 MRC Mitochondrial Biology Unit (MRC MBU)
 MRC Toxicology Unit

Cardiff
 MRC Centre for Neuropsychiatric Genetics and Genomics (based at Cardiff University)

Dundee
 MRC Protein Phosphorylation and Ubiquitylation Unit at the University of Dundee (MRC PPU)

Edinburgh
 MRC Centre for Cognitive Ageing and Cognitive Epidemiology (MRC CCACE) (based at the University of Edinburgh)
 MRC Centre for Genetics and Molecular Medicine (IGMM) (based at the University of Edinburgh)
 MRC Centre for Regenerative Medicine (CRM) (based at the University of Edinburgh); Stuart Forbes, Director
 MRC Centre for Reproductive Health (CRH) (based at the University of Edinburgh)
 MRC Human Genetics Unit at the University of Edinburgh (MRC HGU) (based at the University of Edinburgh)
 The Scottish Collaboration for Public Health Research and Policy (SCPHRP) (based at the University of Edinburgh)

Exeter
 MRC Centre for Medical Mycology at the University of Exeter (MRC CMM)

Entebbe
 MRC/UVRI Uganda Research Unit on AIDS

Fajara
 MRC Unit, The Gambia

Glasgow
 MRC/Chief Scientist Office Social and Public Health Sciences Unit, University of Glasgow (MRC/CSO SPHSU)  
 MRC/University of Glasgow Centre for Virus Research (MRC-UofG CVR)

Harwell
 MRC Mammalian Genetics Unit (MRC MGU)
 Mary Lyon Centre
 Research Complex at Harwell (RCaH)

Liverpool
 MRC/Arthritis Research UK Centre for Integrated Research into Muscular Aging
 MRC Centre for Drug Safety Science (based at the University of Liverpool)

London
 MRC Asthma UK Centre in Allergic Mechanisms of Asthma (based at King's College London)
 MRC Laboratory for Molecular Cell Biology at UCL (MRC LMCB at UCL) (based at University College London)
 MRC Centre for Developmental Neurobiology (based at King's College London)
 MRC Centre for Molecular Bacteriology and Infection (based at Imperial College London)
 MRC Centre for Neurodegenerative Research (based at King's College London)
 MRC Centre for Neuromuscular Diseases (based at University College London)
 MRC Centre for Global Infectious Disease Analysis (based at Imperial College London)
 MRC Centre for Transplantation (based at King's College London)
 MRC London Institute of Medical Sciences (MRC LMS) (based at Imperial College London)
 Francis Crick Institute (Partnership between the MRC, Cancer Research UK, Imperial College London, King's College London, the Wellcome Trust and University College London)
 MRC Clinical Trials Unit at UCL (MRC CTU at UCL) (based at University College London)
 Centre for Environment and Health (jointly based at King's College London and Imperial College London)
 MRC International Nutrition Group (based at the London School of Hygiene & Tropical Medicine)
 MRC - National Institute for Medical Research Phenome Centre (based at Imperial College London but in collaboration with King's College London)
 MRC Prion Unit (based at University College London)
 MRC Unit for Lifelong Health and Ageing at UCL (MRC LHA at UCL), home of the National Survey of Health & Development

Newcastle
 MRC Centre for Brain Ageing and Vitality (MRC CBAV) (based at Newcastle University)

Oxford
 CRUK/MRC Oxford Institute for Radiation Oncology (OIRO) (based at the University of Oxford)
 MRC Brain Network Dynamics Unit at the University of Oxford
 MRC Human Immunology Unit at the University of Oxford (MRC HIU)
 MRC Molecular Haematology Unit at the University of Oxford (MRC MHU)
 MRC Population Health Research Unit at the University of Oxford
 MRC Weatherall Institute of Molecular Medicine (based at the University of Oxford)

Salisbury
 Centre for Macaques

Southampton
 Arthritis Research UK/MRC Centre for Musculoskeletal Health and Work
 MRC Lifecourse Epidemiology Unit at the University of Southampton (MRC LEU)

Multiple across UK
 Health Data Research UK (Central management at Wellcome Trust, London)
 UK Dementia Research Institute (Central management at UCL)

See also 
 National Institute for Health and Care Research

Notes and references

Further reading
 Austoker, Joan, and Linda Bryder, eds. Historical perspectives on the role of the MRC: essays in the history of the Medical Research Council of the United Kingdom and its predecessor, the Medical Research Committee, 1913–1953 (Oxford UP, 1989)
 Fisher D.  "The Rockefeller Foundation and the Development of Scientific Medicine in Britain" Minerva (1987) 16#1, 20–41.
 Sussex, Jon, et al. "Quantifying the economic impact of government and charity funding of medical research on private research and development funding in the United Kingdom." BMC Medicine 14#1 (2016): 1+
 Viergever, Roderik F., and Thom CC Hendriks. "The 10 largest public and philanthropic funders of health research in the world: what they fund and how they distribute their funds." Health Research Policy and Systems 14#1 (2016): 1.

External links 
 

British medical research
Medical education in the United Kingdom
Research councils
Science and technology in the United Kingdom
Organisations based in the City of Westminster
Government agencies established in 1913
1913 establishments in the United Kingdom
Non-departmental public bodies of the United Kingdom government